Forum Peak is a summit located on the border of Alberta and British Columbia on the Continental Divide. It is the southernmost mountain in the Canadian Rockies, situated only 500 metres north of the Canada–United States border. It was named after Forum Lake below the mountain. It is visible from the end of Highway 5 at Cameron Lake, which is within Waterton Lakes National Park, and the mountain is on the park's southwest border.

Geology

Like other mountains in Waterton Lakes National Park, Forum Peak is composed of sedimentary rock laid down during the Precambrian to Jurassic periods. Formed in shallow seas, this sedimentary rock was pushed east and over the top of younger Cretaceous period rock during the Laramide orogeny.

Climate

Based on the Köppen climate classification, Forum Peak is located in a subarctic climate with cold, snowy winters, and mild summers.

See also
List of peaks on the Alberta–British Columbia border
Mountains of Alberta
Mountains of British Columbia

References

External links
 National Park Service web site: Waterton Lakes National Park
 Forum Peak weather: Mountain Forecast

Forum Peak
Forum Peak
Canadian Rockies